A neurotropic virus is a virus that is capable of infecting nerve tissue.

Terminology 
A neurotropic virus is said to be neuroinvasive if it is capable of accessing or entering the nervous system and neurovirulent if it is capable of causing disease within the nervous system. Both terms are often applied to central nervous system infections, although some neurotropic viruses are highly neuroinvasive for the peripheral nervous system (e.g. herpes simplex virus). Important neuroinvasive viruses include poliovirus, which is highly neurovirulent but weakly neuroinvasive, and rabies virus, which is highly neurovirulent but requires tissue trauma (often resulting from an animal bite) to become neuroinvasive. Using these definitions, herpes simplex virus is highly neuroinvasive for the peripheral nervous system and rarely neuroinvasive for the central nervous system, but in the latter case may cause herpesviral encephalitis and is therefore considered highly neurovirulent. Many arthropod-borne neurotropic viruses, like West Nile virus, spread to the brain primarily via the blood system by crossing the blood–brain barrier in what is called hematogenous dissemination.

Examples 
Neurotropic viruses that cause infection include Japanese Encephalitis, Venezuelan Equine Encephalitis, and California encephalitis viruses; polio, coxsackie, echo, mumps, measles, influenza and rabies, as well as diseases caused by members of the family Herpesviridae such as herpes simplex, varicella-zoster, Epstein–Barr, cytomegalovirus and HHV-6 viruses. All seven of the known human coronaviruses are neurotropic, the common cold viruses mainly in vulnerable populations while the more virulent SARS-CoV-1, MERS, and SARS-CoV-2 frequently attack the nervous systems (primarily in animal models).

Those causing latent infection include herpes simplex and varicella-zoster viruses. Those causing slow virus infection include measles virus, rubella and JC viruses, and retroviruses such as human T-lymphotropic virus 1 and HIV.

Research use 
Neurotropic viruses are increasingly being exploited as research tools, and for their potential use in treatment. In particular, they are being used to improve the understanding of the nervous systems circuits.

Other neurotropic infections 
Several diseases, including transmissible spongiform encephalopathy, kuru, and Creutzfeldt–Jakob disease resemble a slow neurotropic virus infection—but are, in fact, caused by the infectious proteins known as prions.

See also 
 Blood–brain barrier
 Immunology
 Pathogen
 Virulent

References 

Viruses